Cynthia Nicholas may refer to:

Cindy Nicholas (1957–2016), Canadian swimmer and politician
Cynthia Nicholas (canoeist) (born 1937), Australian canoer